Bradley Robert Moss (born 2 September 2000), known professionally as Ghosty, is a British record producer and DJ. He is regarded as one of the UK's best producers in the country's music industry. He gained widespread recognition in the UK music scene after he produced Digga D's "No Diet" in 2019, which peaked at number 20 on the UK Singles Chart and was later included on Double Tap Diaries. Other notable projects he has produced are Central Cee's "Molly" and 22Gz's mixtape Growth and Development.

Early life and career

Ghosty was born and grew up in East London and Essex. At age 10, Bradley developed an interest in production after he was inspired by his neighbor DJing in the house. At the same age, he was gifted a Serato Mixtrack Pro by his mother, where he extensively developed his production and DJ'ing skills as he mixed jungle and drum and bass. He then downloaded FL Studio and continued his career by creating his portfolio as a producer and honing his skills in the genre, drawing early inspiration from American producers Lex Luger and Southside.

In 2019, during his A-levels, he produced Digga D's single "No Diet", which propelled him into popularity and resulted in him getting more placements from popular drill artists such as Headie One, Dave with the track "Paper Cuts", Unknown T's "Drip Drip" featuring V9, 22Gz, where Ghosty was co-featured in two of his albums, Growth and Development and The Blixky Tape in 2020 and 2021, respectively, and Russian rapper 's Players Club, which was certified 2× platinum by Believe Russia and was produced alongside British producers AV and Gotcha. Ghosty was signed to Sony Music Publishing in 2020 for a publishing deal.

Musical style
Focusing in the drill subgenre of hip hop, Ghosty utilizes an idiosyncratic mix of heavy bass and 808 slides, rattling percussions and hi-hats, and dark, gothic melodies that discerned him from other existing producers in the drill community. He also does trap, an offshoot of hip hop of which he has released drum kits for production.

Producer tag 
Ghosty is well known by his fan base for his producer tag Ghosty, which has a delayed and reverebed audio effect.

Discography

Albums and mixtapes

Singles produced

Extended plays

Awards and nominations

References

2000 births
Living people
British record producers
British DJs
UK drill musicians
Sony Music Publishing artists